Both folk and urban legends have served as inspiration for a number of depictions of Bloody Mary, a ghost, phantom or spirit conjured to reveal the future; these are especially prevalent in films and television shows dealing with the supernatural.

Specific cultural references

Specific reference to Bloody Mary are made in the following:

Film
 Urban Legends: Bloody Mary, a 2005 horror film by Mary Lambert, is the third installment in the Urban Legend series. Here Mary is conjured just by speaking her name, and starts to target the descendants of the five people responsible for her death; she was killed as part of a prank gone wrong at prom 1969, over three decades previously.
 Bloody Mary, a 2006 film set in a psychiatric hospital.
 Dead Mary, a 2007 film based on a screenplay titled Bloody Mary.
 The Legend of Bloody Mary, a 2008 film by director John Stecenko, includes a character, Amy, who goes missing for good after playing the game "Bloody Mary".
 Bloody Mary, a 2011 horror film by director Charlie Vaughn in which a group of filmmakers awaken a seductive version of Bloody Mary.
 Ghost Killers vs. Bloody Mary, a 2018 Brazilian horror-comedy film about a group of ghost hunting YouTubers that are called by a school to calm down the students after Bloody Mary appears.

Stage
 In 2008, for their annual "Halloween Horror Nights" event, Universal Studios Florida developed a new variation of the legend. In their version, "Mary Agana" was a doctor who studied fear by exposing her patients to it. But as time went on she became more and more twisted until she herself became the ghost Bloody Mary that twisted legend and lore into something dark and sinister.

Television
 A season two episode of Charmed ("Chick Flick") involves a demon who makes killers from different horror movies come to life. One of these killers is Bloody Mary.
  In the Ghost Whisperer TV series' third season, an episode ("Don't Try This at Home") involves the Bloody Mary legend.
 Supernatural, the paranormal TV series, had an episode titled "Bloody Mary" during its first season, involving a ghost that attacked those who were looking into a mirror while her name was repeated, although she was only capable of "leaping" into mirrors within a certain range of the mirror that she killed herself in front of. In the course of the investigation, it is revealed that the original "Bloody Mary" was an aspiring actress named Mary Worthington (portrayed by Jovanna Burke) who was found dead in front of her mirror of an apparent suicide, but she wrote the first few letters of a name on the glass before she died. The detective responsible for investigating the case noted that Mary was said to be having an affair with a doctor named Trevor Sampson, speculating that he was the actual killer, but there was no actual evidence to prove that theory. Due to her death, Mary's ghost would only attack people who looked in a mirror while her name was being invoked if they had some secret relating to their role in the death of someone else, whether or not the person speaking the name was the person who had the secret. However, becoming a vengeful spirit corrupts Mary's judgement, with the result that she goes after people with any kind of secret relating to the death of someone else; as an example, one of her first victims was a man who killed his wife and made it look like a suicide, and another is a girl who killed a boy in a hit-and-run accident and never told anyone about it, but a later "target" is a girl whose obsessive boyfriend killed himself because she left him, even though in the last case the girl didn't actually kill her boyfriend herself. The Winchester brothers were able to defeat her by drawing her out of her mirror and then showing her her own reflection, causing her to 'judge' herself. In "Moriah" going into Season 15, Mary Worthington is among the condemned spirits in Hell that were unleashed on Earth by God as part of his attack on the brothers.
 "Syzygy", an episode of The X-Files, concerns her legend.
 The two-part season 1 finale of the horror anthology show The Haunting Hour: The Series is called "Scary Mary", and mirrors, much like the Bloody Mary tale, play a major role in the episode, as Mary and her minions transport themselves through them and she can talk through them. However, she is described as being vain, dying from being inside a burning farmhouse, and her spirit is a face-stealer, as all of her minions are girls who have given their faces to her.
Episode 2 of Gary and his Demons involves Bloody Mary as an informant who helps the demon hunter Gary to go after the latest mirror monster.
"Jinxed", an episode of Regular Show, involves a parody of Bloody Mary where Rigby, having been jinxed by Mordecai, locks himself in a dark bathroom, writes his name on the mirror and repeats his name three times to break the jinx. However, when he does so, a demonic version of himself appears and starts terrorizing the town. In order for the demon to go away, Rigby had to say his name in reverse three times.
The South Park episode "Hell on Earth 2006" sees Butters Stotch summoning the ghost of rapper Biggie Smalls by saying his name three times in front of the bathroom mirror with the lights off, a clear reference to Bloody Mary.
the American Horror Stories anthology, season 2, episode 5, Bloody Mary. She appears as a black deity that grants wishes only after you complete a gruesome task or act. If not she will gouge your eyes out. Also will do it if she doesn’t like what she sees in your soul. 2022

Books 
 The main villain of Cyber Shogun Revolution takes the name of Bloody Mary as she terrorizes the United States of Japan.
 In the young adult ghost story Who's at the Door? the author, JC Bratton, intertwines the mirror-as-portal concept with the Bloody Mary urban legend.

Video games
 Bloody Mary is one of the toughest bosses in the 1995 SNES JRPG game Terranigma.
 In the action-adventure game Dishonored (2012), the player can read a book titled, Rhyme of the Rosewater Hag, which tells the story of a vengeful mother who seeks to murder her own daughter in cold blood. The book then gives instructions to an outdoor activity where the performer has to soak their head in a fountain of rose petals for three seconds and then gasp for air. If the performer is holy, the vengeful mother will spare them and not reveal herself. But if the performer is sinful, then the vengeful mother will appear and strangle them with a noose made of rose thorns.
 The Wolf Among Us, a 2013 video game based on the Fables comic book series, introduces the Bloody Mary legend as a Fable and one of the key antagonists in the game, voiced by Kathryn Cressida. This version of Bloody Mary has the ability to teleport through any reflective surface. Her true form include features like shark-like teeth, blood seeping from her eyes, and shards of mirror piercing her flesh all over. GamesRadar+ staff ranked her among the best villainous characters in video games. 
 The mobile and PC survival horror game Identity V (2018) features a playable hunter named Bloody Queen, or Mary, who uses mirrors as a tool and a mirror shard as a weapon. Although her backstory suggests she born to a royal family in France, she suffered the same fate as the historical Bloody Mary in England; an execution by guillotine.
 Bloody Mary is one of the playable characters in the horror fighting game Terrordrome – Reign of the Legends (2020).
 Bloody Mary is one of the playable characters in the 2021 roguelike video game Rogue Lords. In this version, she's a young bride who was murdered the day of her wedding and revived by the Devil as a vengeful ghost who delights in bloodshed. She displays a playful, childlike personality and uses mirror-themed abilities, including placing a floating mirror behind her adversaries to replicate every attack through it.

Music 

 American singer-songwriter Lady Gaga references Bloody Mary in her second studio album Born This Way (2011), where Bloody Mary is mentioned by name on track 8 of the album, entitled "Born This Way (album)".

Other
 The Bloody Mary Show, a British comedy web series which portrays Bloody Mary's daily life
 The Unmatched board game series featured Bloody Mary as a playable character in 2022.

References and notes

Demons in popular culture
Fiction about witchcraft
Ghosts in popular culture
Legendary creatures in popular culture